Azal is a sub-district located in al-Radmah District, Ibb Governorate, Yemen. Azal had a population of 7974 according to the 2004 census.

References 

Sub-districts in Ar Radmah District